Hupmobile Club Sedan – R was a vehicle produced by the Hupp Motor Company.

Hupmobile Club Sedan – R specifications (1926 data) 

 Color – Lower body and hood, beige or blue; Upper body, fenders, and running gear, black.
 Seating Capacity – Five
 Wheelbase – 115 inches
 Wheels - Wood
 Tires - 31" × 5.25" balloon
 Service Brakes – Contracting on rear wheels
 Emergency Brakes – expanding on rear wheels
 Engine  - Four cylinder, vertical, cast en block, 3 × 5 inches; head removable; valves in side; H.P. 16.90 N.A.C.C. rating
 Lubrication – Force feed and splash
 Crankshaft - Three bearing
 Radiator – Cellular
 Cooling – Thermo-syphon
 Ignition – Storage Battery
 Starting System – Two Unit
 Voltage – Six
 Wiring System – Single
 Gasoline System – Vacuum
 Clutch – Dry single plate
 Transmission – Selective sliding
 Gear Changes – 3 forward, 1 reverse
 Drive – Spiral bevel
 Rear Springs – Semi-elliptic
 Rear Axle – Semi-floating
 Steering Gear – Cam and lever

Standard equipment
New car price included the following items:
 tools
 jack
 speedometer
 ammeter
 electric horn
 ignition theft lock
 windshield cleaner
 demountable rims
 spare rim
 snubbers
 spare tire carrier
 rear view mirror
 sun visor
 cowl ventilator
 headlight dimmer
 luggage trunk

Prices
New car prices were F.O.B. factory, plus Tax:
 Five passenger Touring - $1225
 Two passenger Roadster - $1225
 Five passenger Club Sedan - $1375
 Two passenger Coupé - $1350

See also
 Hupmobile

References
Source: 

Cars of the United States
Hupmobile